Substation No. 15 is a heritage-listed electrical substation at 182 Johnston Street, Annandale, Inner West Council, Sydney, New South Wales, Australia. It was built in 1910. The property is owned by Ausgrid. It was added to the New South Wales State Heritage Register on 2 April 1999.

History 
Substation No. 15 is a purpose designed and built structure dating from 1910. It is the second-oldest substation in the Ausgrid network, was the first substation in Annandale, and though once common, is the last of its design still in operation.

The building underwent restoration in 2013.

Description 
Substation No. 15 is an impressively detailed face brick and sandstone double height building designed in the Federation Freestyle. Decorative and stylistic features include a rusticated and moulded sandstone arch surrounding the central doorway, an unusual moulded sandstone gable parapet, contrasting banded brickwork, a patterned brick infill panel, and sandstone intels above doorways, windows and vents.

The substation is constructed in contrasting banded brickwork with sandstone banding, gable-parapet and lintels. A rusticated sandstone arch surrounds the main roller-shutter steel doorway.

The words "Sydney ELECTRIC LIGHTING" and "SMC 1910" appear on the facade mounted as single letters.

It was reported to be in good condition as at 8 November 2000.

Heritage listing 

Substation No. 15 is an unusual, rare and representative example of a purpose designed structure. Built in the early 20th century, it has an elaborate, well detailed Federation Freestyle facade. The building is of State Significance. The building is located within the Annandale Urban conservation area as listed by the National Trust.

Substation No. 15 was listed on the New South Wales State Heritage Register on 2 April 1999.

See also

References

Attribution 

New South Wales State Heritage Register
Annandale, New South Wales
Electric power infrastructure in New South Wales
Articles incorporating text from the New South Wales State Heritage Register
1910 establishments in Australia
Energy infrastructure completed in 1910